YEM may refer to:

 Yemen, the country in Southwest Asia
 Manitowaning/Manitoulin East Municipal Airport, the IATA airport code
 "You Enjoy Myself", a song by the jam band Phish

Yem may refer to:

 Yếm, an ancient Vietnamese bodice worn by women
 Yem people, an ethnic group of southern Ethiopia
 Yem language, the language of the Yem people
 Yem Special Woreda, a region in southern Ethiopia named after the Yem people
 Tavastians, Russian name for a historic people and a modern subgroup of the Finnish people